College Square is a shopping centre in Nepean, a suburb of Ottawa, Ontario, Canada, located at the intersection of Woodroffe Avenue and Baseline Road, and is north of Algonquin College.

Originally called Shoppers City West, the mall opened in November 1961. Over the years, the mall featured stores like Loblaws, Freimans, Towers (later Zellers), LCBO, BMO, Pet Valu as well as a miniature cinema featuring large TV's showing second-run movies and Chances R, a restaurant co-owned by former NHL player and Ottawa 67's coach Brian Kilrea. Other services detached from the main building included Top Valu gas station and car wash, Beer Store, McDonald's and a round-shaped building that had a convenience store, Pinto.

In July 2001, Shoppers City West was closed and redeveloped as College Square by First Capital Realty and the Leiken Group. The new stores opened 2002—2003. Current tenants include anchors Loblaws and Home Depot, Beer Store, Dollarama, Garage, LCBO, Kettleman's Bagel Co., McDonald's, Pizza Pizza, Popeyes, Rexall, Reitman's, Starbucks, Subway, Tim Hortons and Tommy Hilfiger. Chances R and BMO are the only remaining original tenants.

References

External links 
 https://web.archive.org/web/20160304195302/http://www.obj.ca/Other/Archives/2001-01-22/article-2161000/College-Square-replaces-Shoppers-City-West-mall/1

Shopping malls in Ottawa
Shopping malls established in 1961
1961 establishments in Ontario